Arto Kalevi Javanainen (April 8, 1959 – January 25, 2011) was a professional ice hockey player who played in the SM-liiga.  He was the first European draft pick in Pittsburgh Penguins history, going in the fifth round (118th overall).

Career
Javanainen played for Ässät and TPS. During his 14-year career in the SM-liiga of Finland, he won the goal scoring title five times and led the league in points once, in 1985–86 scoring a career best 71 points in 36 games. He is all-time leading goalscorer in SM-liiga and second in all-time points after Janne Ojanen.

Javanainen played one year of professional hockey in North America. He scored four goals and added an assist in 14 games for the Pittsburgh Penguins during the 1984–85 National Hockey League season. He also played for the American Hockey League Baltimore Skipjacks that same season, scoring 26 goals and 29 assists for 55 points in the regular season and adding five goals and four assists in the playoffs.

He was inducted into the Finnish Hockey Hall of Fame in 2000.

Death

On January 26, 2011, Javanainen died in a Turku, Finland hospital after battling a long illness. He was 51 years old. He is survived by a wife and two children.

Career statistics

Regular season and playoffs

International

References

External links
 Finnish Hockey Hall of Fame bio
 

1959 births
2011 deaths
Ässät players
Baltimore Skipjacks players
Finnish ice hockey right wingers
Ice hockey players at the 1984 Winter Olympics
Montreal Canadiens draft picks
Olympic ice hockey players of Finland
Sportspeople from Pori
Pittsburgh Penguins draft picks
Pittsburgh Penguins players
HC TPS players
Ice hockey players with retired numbers